Deira (Old Welsh/Cumbric: Deywr or Deifr;  or ) was an area of Post-Roman Britain, and a later Anglian kingdom.

Etymology
The name of the kingdom is of Brythonic origin, and is derived from the Proto-Celtic *daru, meaning 'oak' ( in modern Welsh), in which case it would mean 'the people of the Derwent', a derivation also found in the Latin name for Malton, . It is cognate with the modern Irish word ; the names for County Londonderry and the city of Derry stem from this word.

History

Brythonic Deira
Following the Roman withdrawal from Britain a number of successor kingdoms rose in northern England, reflecting pre-Roman tribal territories. The area between the Humber and River Tees known as Deywr or Deifr corresponds to the tribal lands of the Parisi, bordered to the west and north by the Brythonic kingdoms of Elfed and Bryneich respectively, and to the east by the North Sea.

Early Deira may have centred on Petuaria (modern Brough) and archaeological evidence shows that the town was refortified. Petuaria was a great tribal centre for the Parisi, but declined in importance from the mid-fourth century (possibly as the harbour silted up). After this period, Derventio (modern Malton) may have functioned as the region's capital.

It is not known if Deira was ever an independent Brythonic kingdom, and no British king has been identified with the area from the surviving genealogies, poems or chronicles. However the area was subject to the same fractious inheritance traditions and changing power dynamic (following the Roman withdrawal) that allowed Elfed and Bryneich to become independent hereditary kingdoms in the early fifth century. In Welsh literature Deira is part of the Hen Ogledd (Old North) region, which was divided into many related kingdoms after the death of Coel Hen (Coel the Old).

Anglian Deira
The kingdom,  which was previously ruled by a British dynasty, was probably created in the third quarter of the fifth century when Anglian warriors invaded the Derwent Valley. Anglian Deira's territory also extended from the Humber to the Tees, and from the sea to the western edge of the Vale of York. It later merged with the kingdom of Bernicia, its northern neighbour, to form the kingdom of Northumbria.

According to Simeon of Durham (writing early in the 12th century), it extended from the Humber to the Tyne, but the land was waste north of the Tees.

Archaeology suggests that the Anglian royal house was in place by the middle of the fifth century, but the first certainly recorded king is Ælla in the late sixth century. After his death, Deira was subject to king Æthelfrith of Bernicia, who united the two kingdoms into Northumbria. Æthelfrith ruled until the accession of Ælla's son Edwin, in 616 or 617, who also ruled both kingdoms until 633.

Osric, the nephew of Edwin, ruled Deira after Edwin, but his son Oswine was put to death by Oswiu in 651. For a few years subsequently, Deira was governed by Æthelwald son of Oswald of Bernicia.

Bede wrote of Deira in his Historia Ecclesiastica (completed in 731).

Anglian kings of Deira

Notes

References 

Higham, N.J. (1993). The Kingdom of Northumbria AD 350–1100. Stroud: Sutton.

Further reading
Geake, Helen & Kenny, Jonathan (eds.) (2000). Early Deira: Archaeological studies of the East Riding in the fourth to ninth centuries AD. Oxford: Oxbow. 

550s establishments
660s disestablishments
Former countries in the British Isles
History of Yorkshire
Northumbria
Peoples of Anglo-Saxon England
Petty kingdoms of England
States and territories disestablished in the 7th century
States and territories established in the 6th century
Former monarchies of Europe